The Bears–Cardinals rivalry is a National Football League (NFL) rivalry between the Chicago Bears and the Arizona Cardinals. It is the oldest rivalry in the NFL and features the only two teams that remain from the league's inception in 1920. At that time, the Bears were known as the Decatur Staleys, and the Cardinals were the Racine Cardinals. In 1922, both teams moved to Chicago, and the matchup between the teams became known as "The Battle of Chicago" for 38 years, making it the first true rivalry in the league's history. 

The rivalry diminished after the 1959 NFL season, when the Cardinals relocated to St. Louis. After the re-location, the NFL treated the Cardinals and Bears like any other inter-divisional pairing for scheduling purposes, resulting in the teams playing much less frequently. With the completion of the AFL-NFL merger in 1970, the enlarged NFL seriously considered (in addition to at least four other possible solutions) an alignment for the new National Football Conference that would have placed the Cardinals and Bears in the same division. Ultimately, this alignment was not chosen, and instead the Bears were placed in the NFC Central and the Cardinals in the NFC East. When the Cardinals moved to Arizona in 1988, the rivalry was further diminished. 

Under the current NFL scheduling formula, the Bears and Cardinals play at least once every three years. The Bears currently lead the all-time series 59–29–6.

History

The first meeting
The Decatur Staleys and Racine Cardinals met for the first time on November 28, 1920 at Normal Park. Around 5,000 fans showed up to watch the Cardinals defeat the Staleys, 7–6. The lost was the only blemish in the Staleys record that season (ties were disregarded), and cost them the first American Professional Football Association title.

Grange's debut and 0–0 games
Shortly after finishing his college career at the University of Illinois, Red Grange made his NFL debut with the Bears on Thanksgiving against the Cardinals in 1925. Around 36,000 fans showed up at Cubs Park to see the Bears tie the Cardinals 0–0. In fact, this was one of 17 consecutive games after their first meeting which ended in a shutout for either or both teams, with four 0–0 scores. The Cardinals would win their first (and highly disputed) of two NFL championships that season.

The Ernie Nevers Game
The Cardinals' Ernie Nevers scored a still-standing NFL record of 40 points in a single game, doing so with six touchdowns and four extra points. Nevers scored all of the points in the Cardinals' 40–6 victory over the Bears on November 28, 1929. It was also the first game between the two teams since their inaugural game that did not end in a shutout.

Pat Coffee's 97-yard touchdown
The Cardinals' 42–28 loss to the Bears at Wrigley Field in 1937 was mostly remembered for Pat Coffee's then-record 97-yard touchdown pass to Gaynell Tinsley, one of ten combined touchdown passes in the game.

1950s: The end of the local rivalry
The Cardinals won their second and most recent NFL championship in 1947, but by the 1950s, the team was struggling on the field and at the gate. Nevertheless, in the 13 meetings between the Bears and Cardinals during the decade, the Bears only won seven of them. The Cardinals' last victory as a Chicago team over the Bears was a memorable one, as they won 53–14 at Comiskey Park in 1955 behind Ollie Matson's two touchdowns, including a 77-yard punt return. The Bears finished with a 47–19–6 all-time record against the Chicago Cardinals.

1960–1987: Chicago vs. St. Louis
In the 1960 season, the Cardinals moved to St. Louis, keeping the team name despite the existence of the baseball Cardinals in the city. Coincidentally, both Cardinals franchises shared the same building during the football Cardinals' 28 seasons in St. Louis: Busch Stadium I from 1960 to 1965, and Busch Memorial Stadium from 1966 to 1987. The two teams met only eleven times during the Cardinals' tenure in St. Louis, with the Cardinals amassing a 6–5 record. The Bears never played at Busch Stadium I. In the teams' first-ever meeting in St. Louis during the 1966 season, Cardinal defensive back Larry Wilson intercepted three passes, including a game-winning pick-six in St. Louis' 24–17 victory. Despite the Cardinals' success in St. Louis against the Bears, they only made four playoff appearances, and would once again be on the move after the 1987 season. The last-ever meeting between the Bears and St. Louis Cardinals came in the 1984 season, a game which saw Neil Lomax gash Buddy Ryan's 46 defense for six completions and 166 yards to Roy Green, and Ottis Anderson score two touchdowns in the Cardinals' 38–21 victory.

1988–present: Chicago vs. Phoenix/Arizona
The Cardinals moved further west to the Phoenix metropolitan area in 1988, becoming the Phoenix Cardinals. They then changed their name to the Arizona Cardinals in the 1994 season. As of 2021, the Bears won seven of 11 meetings with the Arizona Cardinals, but to this day, the teams have yet to face each other in the NFL playoffs.

The Dennis Green Game

The most memorable game of the rivalry took place on Monday Night Football during the 2006 season. The then-undefeated Bears (5–0 heading into the game) trailed the 1–4 Cardinals by 20 points at halftime, and trailed 23–10 heading into the fourth quarter. However, Bears cornerback Charles Tillman returned a fumble by Edgerrin James 40 yards for a touchdown, and returner Devin Hester sealed the Bears' comeback victory with a 83-yard punt return touchdown. The final score was 24–23 Bears. After the loss, Cardinals head coach Dennis Green made a memorable post-game rant with the media, screaming "They (the Bears) are who we thought they were, and we let them off the hook!"

Game results

|-
| rowspan="2"| 
| style="| Cardinals  7–6
| Normal Field
| Cardinals  1–0
| The APFA's first season. First meeting at Normal Field.
|-
| style="| Staleys  10–0
| Cubs Field
| Tied  1–1
| First meeting at Cubs Field.
|-
| 
| Tie  0–0
| Cubs Field
| Tie  1–1–1
| First home game of the matchup for the Staleys. First matchup with the Staleys as a Chicago-based team. tied for the lowest scoring matchup in league history. Staleys win 1921 APFA Championship
|- 
| rowspan="2"| 
| style="| Cardinals  6–0
| Comiskey Park
| Cardinals  2–1–1
| The APFA renames itself as the National Football League (NFL). Cardinals' first season being called "Chicago." "Staleys" rename themselves as the "Bears." First game in Comiskey Park. Thanksgiving Day game.
|-
| style="| Cardinals  9–0
| Comiskey Park
| Cardinals  3–1–1
| 
|-
| 
| style="| Bears  3–0
| Cubs Field
| Cardinals  3–2–1
| Thanksgiving Day game.
|- 
| rowspan="2"| 
| style="| Bears  6–0
| Cubs Park
| Tie  3–3–1
| 
|-
| style="| Bears  21–0
| Comiskey Park
| Bears  4–3–1
| Thanksgiving Day game. Bears take the lead in the rivalry
|-
| rowspan="2"| 
| style="| Cardinals  9–0
| Comiskey Park
| Tie  4–4–1
| 
|-
| Tie  0–0
| Cubs Park
| Tie  4–4–2
| Thanksgiving Day game. Cardinals win 1925 NFL Championship.
|-
| rowspan="3"| 
| style="| Bears  16–0
| Cubs Park
| Bears  5–4–2
| 
|-
| style="| Bears  10–0
| Soldier Field
| Bears  6–4–2
| First game at Soldier Field
|-
| Tie  0–0
| Cubs Park
| Bears  6–4–3
| Thanksgiving Day game. 
|-
| rowspan="2"| 
| style="| Bears  9–0
| Normal Park
| Bears  7–4–3
| 
|-
| style="| Cardinals  3–0
| Wrigley Field
| Bears  7–5–3
| Cubs Field is renamed Wrigley Field. Thanksgiving Day game. 
|-
| rowspan="2"| 
| style="| Bears  15–0
| Normal Park
| Bears  8–5–3
| Final game at Normal Field
|-
| style="| Bears  34–0
| Wrigley Field
| Bears  9–5–3
| Thanksgiving Day game. 
|-
| rowspan="2"| 
| Tie  0–0
| Wrigley Field
| Bears  9–5–4
| 
|-
| style="| Cardinals  34–0
| Comiskey Park
| Bears  9–6–4
| Thanksgiving Day game. 
|-

|-
| rowspan="2"| 
| style="| Bears  32–6
| Comiskey Park
| Bears  10–6–4
| 
|-
| style="| Bears  6–0
| Wrigley Field
| Bears  11–6–4
| Thanksgiving Day game. 
|-
| rowspan="2"| 
| style="| Bears  26–13
| Wrigley Field
| Bears  12–6–4
| Cardinals' first home game at Wrigley Field
|-
| style="| Bears  18–7
| Wrigely Field
| Bears  13–6–4
| Thanksgiving Day game. 
|-
| rowspan="2"| 
| Tie  0–0
| Wrigley Field
| Bears  13–6–5
| 
|-
| style="| Bears  34–0
| Wrigley Field
| Bears  14–6–5
| Thanksgiving Day game. Bears win 1932 NFL Championship
|-
| rowspan="2"| 
| style="| Bears  12–9
| Wrigley Field
| Bears  15–6–5
| 
|-
| style="| Bears  22–6
| Wrigley Field
| Bears  16–6–5
| Final Thanksgiving Day game to date for the matchup. Bears win 1933 NFL Championship.
|-
| rowspan="2"| 
| style="| Bears  20–0
| Wrigley Field
| Bears  17–6–5
| 
|-
| style="| Bears  17–6
| Wrigley Field
| Bears  18–6–5
| Bears lose 1934 NFL Championship.
|-
| rowspan="2"| 
| Tie  7–7
| Wrigley Field
| Bears  18–6–6
| Latest tied game in the matchup
|-
| style="| Bears  13–0
| Wrigley Field
| Bears  19–6–6
|  
|-
| rowspan="2"| 
| style="| Bears  7–3
| Wrigley Field
| Bears  20–6–6
| 
|-
| style="| Cardinals  14–7
| Wrigley Field
| Bears  20–7–6
| 
|-
| rowspan="2"| 
| style="| Bears  16–7
| Wrigley Field
| Bears  21–7–6
| 
|-
| style="| Bears  42–28
| Wrigley Field
| Bears  22–7–6
| Bears lose 1937 NFL Championship. 
|-
| rowspan="2"| 
| style="| Bears  16–13
| Wrigley Field
| Bears  23–7–6
| 
|-
| style="| Bears  34–28
| Wrigley Field
| Bears  24–7–6
| 
|-
| rowspan="2"| 
| style="| Bears  44–7
| Wrigley Field
| Bears  25–7–6
| 
|-
| style="| Bears  48–7
| Wrigley Field
| Bears  26–7–6
|  
|-

|-
| rowspan="2"| 
| style="| Cardinals  21–7
| Comiskey Park
| Bears  26–8–6
| First season back at Comiskey Park for the Cardinals, Wednesday game
|-
| style="| Bears  31–23
| Wrigley Field
| Bears  27–8–6
| Bears win 1940 NFL Championship. 
|-
| rowspan="2"| 
| style="| Bears  53–7
| Wrigley Field
| Bears  28–8–6
| 
|-
| style="| Bears  34–24
| Comiskey Park
| Bears  29–8–6
| Bears win 1941 NFL Championship. 
|-
| rowspan="2"| 
| style="| Bears  41–14
| Wrigley Field
| Bears  30–8–6
| 
|-
| style="| Bears  21–7
| Comiskey Park
| Bears  31–8–6
| Bears go 11-0 in the regular season. Bears lose 1942 NFL Championship. 
|-
| rowspan="2"| 
| style="| Bears  20–0
| Wrigley Field
| Bears  32–8–6
| 
|-
| style="| Bears  35–24
| Comiskey Park
| Bears  33–8–6
| Bears win 1943 NFL Championship. 
|-
| rowspan="2"| 
| style="| Bears  34–7
| Wrigley Field
| Bears  34–8–6
| Cardinals temporarily merged with the Pittsburgh Steelers for the season and was known as "Card-Pitt"
|-
| style="| Bears  49–7
| Forbes Field
| Bears  35–8–6
| Only matchup at Forbes Field 
|-
| rowspan="2"| 
| style="| Cardinals  16–7
| Wrigley Field
| Bears  35–9–6
| 
|-
| style="| Bears  28–20
| Comiskey Park
| Bears  36–9–6
|  
|-
| rowspan="2"| 
| style="| Bears  34–17
| Comiskey Park
| Bears  37–9–6
| 
|-
| style="| Cardinals  35–28
| Wrigley Field
| Bears  37–10–6
| Bears win 1946 NFL Championship. 
|-
| rowspan="2"| 
| style="| Cardinals  31–7
| Comiskey Park
| Bears  37–11–6
| 
|-
| style="| Cardinals  30–21
| Wrigley Field
| Bears  37–12–6
| Cardinals win 1947 NFL Championship. 
|-
| rowspan="2"| 
| style="| Bears  28–17
| Comiskey Park
| Bears  38–12–6
| Monday night game.
|-
| style="| Cardinals  24–21
| Wrigley Field
| Bears  38–13–6
| Cardinals lose 1948 NFL Championship.
|-
| rowspan="2"| 
| style="| Bears  17–7
| Comiskey Park
| Bears  39–13–6
| 
|-
| style="| Bears  52–21
| Wrigley Field
| Bears  40–13–6
| Final matchup as a Western Division rival.
|-

|-
| rowspan="2"| 
| style="| Bears  27–6
| Wrigley Field
| Bears  41–13–6
| 
|-
| style="| Cardinals  20–10
| Comiskey Park
| Bears  41–14–6
|  
|-
| rowspan="2"| 
| style="| Cardinals  16–7
| Comiskey Park
| Bears  41–15–6
| 
|-
| style="| Cardinals  28–20
| Wrigley Field
| Bears  41–16–6
|  
|-
| rowspan="2"| 
| style="| Cardinals  21–10
| Comiskey Park
| Bears  41–17–6
| 
|-
| style="| Bears  10–7
| Wrigley Field
| Bears  42–17–6
|  
|-
| 
| style="| Cardinals  24–17
| Wrigley Field
| Bears  42–18–6
| 
|- 
| 
| style="| Bears  29–7
| Comiskey Park
| Bears  43–18–6
| 
|- 
| 
| style="| Cardinals  53–14
| Comiskey Park
| Bears  43–19–6
| 
|- 
| 
| style="| Bears  10–3
| Wrigley Field
| Bears  44–19–6
| Bears lose 1956 NFL Championship.
|- 
| 
| style="| Bears  14–6
| Comiskey Park
| Bears  45–19–6
| 
|- 
| 
| style="| Bears  30–14
| Wrigley Field
| Bears  46–19–6
| 
|- 
| 
| style="| Bears  31–7
| Comiskey Park
| Bears  47–19–6
| Cardinals play their final game in the matchup as a Chicago-based franchise. 
|- 

|-
| 
| style="| Bears  34–13
| Wrigley Field
| Bears  48–19–6
| First matchup as a Chicago-St. Louis rivalry. 
|- 
| 
| style="| Cardinals  24–17
| Civic Center Busch Memorial Stadium
| Bears  48–20–6
| First game of the matchup in St. Louis.
|- 
| 
| style="| Bears  30–3
| Wrigley Field
| Bears  49–20–6
| Final game of the matchup at Wrigley Field
|- 
| 
| style="| Cardinals  20–17
| Civic Center Busch Memorial Stadium
| Bears  49–21–6
| Final matchup before the NFL-AFL merger 
|- 

|-
| 
| style="| Bears  27–10
| Civic Center Busch Memorial Stadium
| Bears  50–21–6
|  
|- 
| 
| style="| Cardinals  34–20
| Soldier Field
| Bears  50–22–6
| 
|- 
| 
| style="| Cardinals  16–13
| Civic Center Busch Memorial Stadium
| Bears  50–23–6
| 
|- 
| 
| style="| Bears  17–10
| Soldier Field
| Bears  51–23–6
|  
|- 
| 
| style="| Bears  42–6
| Soldier Field
| Bears  52–23–6
|  
|- 

|- 
| 
| style="| Cardinals  10–7
| Soldier Field
| Bears  52–24–6
| 
|- 
| 
| style="| Cardinals  38–21
| Busch Memorial Stadium
| Bears  52–25–6
| Final matchup as a Chicago-St. Louis rivalry 
|- 

|- 
| 
| style="| Bears  31–21
| Sun Devil Stadium
| Bears  53–25–6
| First time in the matchup where the Cardinals are a Phoenix-based franchise. Only matchup while known as the Phoenix Cardinals. First matchup at Sun Devil Stadium.
|- 
| 
| style="| Bears  19–16
| Sun Devil Stadium
| Bears  54–25–6
| First time in the matchup where they are known as the "Arizona" Cardinals. 
|- 
| 
| style="| Cardinals  20–7
| Sun Devil Stadium
| Bears  54–26–6
| Final time in the matchup at Sun Devil Stadium. 
|- 

|-
| 
| style="| Bears  20–13
| Soldier Field
| Bears  55–26–6
|  
|- 
| 
| style="| Bears  28–3
| Soldier Field
| Bears  56–26–6
|  
|-
| 
| style="| Bears  24–23
| University of Phoenix Stadium
| Bears  57–26–6
| First game in the matchup at University of Phoenix Stadium. Monday Night Football game. Bears lose Super Bowl XLI. 
|- 
| 
| style="| Cardinals  41–21
| Soldier Field
| Bears  57–27–6
| 
|-

|-
| 
| style="| Bears  28–13
| University of Phoenix Stadium
| Bears  58–27–6
| 
|-
| 
| style="| Cardinals  48–23
| Soldier Field
| Bears  58–28–6
| 
|-
| 
| style="| Bears  16–14
| State Farm Stadium
| Bears  59–28–6
| 
|-

|-
|
| style="| Cardinals  33–22
| Soldier Field
| Bears  59–29–6
| 
|-
|
|
| Soldier Field
|
|
|-

|-
| Regular season
| style="|
| Bears 31–13–5
| Bears 28–16–1
|
|-
| Postseason
| colspan=3|No postseason meetings as of 2022
|
|-
| Regular and postseason
| style="|
| Bears 31–13–5
| Bears 28–16–1
|
|-

See also

Other Chicago vs. Chicago rivalries 
 Cubs–White Sox rivalry (MLB)

Other Chicago vs. St. Louis rivalries 
 Cardinals–Cubs rivalry (MLB)
 Blackhawks–Blues rivalry (NHL)

References

Further reading

Arizona Cardinals
Chicago Cardinals
St. Louis Cardinals (football)
Chicago Bears
National Football League rivalries
Sports in the Midwestern United States
Chicago Bears rivalries
Arizona Cardinals rivalries